Lefroy Football Club were an Australian rules football club which competed in the Tasmanian Football League (TFL/TANFL). They were known as The Blues and played their home games at North Hobart Oval as well as the Tasmanian Cricket Association Ground. Lefroy players wore dark and light blue as their club colours.

The club was formed at a meeting called by Mr Oscar H. Jones in the Rialto Room, Liverpool Street, Hobart on 28 April 1898 for the purpose of reviving club football in Hobart.

After starting out in the STFA, the club joined the TFL in 1906 when the league was renamed and played in the league until 1941.

Lefroy and Cananore were two of the original clubs to be replaced in the league after World War Two (by Sandy Bay and Hobart respectively) when the TANFL switched to a district-based competition.

Notable footballers to have played with Lefroy include Jim Atkinson, Harvey Kelly and Eric Zschech.

Lefroy were league premiers on nine occasions and dual Tasmanian State Premiership winners.

Premierships
Tasmanian Football League
 Premierships (9): 1898, 1899, 1901, 1907, 1912, 1915, 1924, 1930, 1937
 Runners-Up (12): 1900, 1902, 1908, 1909, 1911, 1913, 1920, 1927, 1929, 1934, 1936, 1938,
 Tasmanian State Premiership (2): 1912, 1924

Club Facts

Most Games: 
 212 by Gavin Luttrell

W.R. Gill Memorial Trophy Winner: 
 E.R.Smith 1925

George Watt Medallists: 
 Eric Zschech 1936, 1937 & 1939

TFL Top Goalkickers: 
 1898 ― W.Abel (11)
 1899 ― W.Facy (16)
 1901 ― R.Hawson (18)
 1912 ― A.Jones (17)
 1915 ― A.Ringrose (18)
 1921 ― R.Manson (42)
 1922 ― R.Manson (41)
 1934 ― T.Heathorn (101)

Highest Score: 
 34.18 (222) vs. Cananore in 1934

Record Crowd:
 10,020 ― Lefroy v North Hobart ― 1929 TANFL Grand Final at North Hobart Oval

References

External links
Club profile at Fullpointsfooty.net

Australian rules football clubs in Tasmania
1898 establishments in Australia
1941 disestablishments in Australia
Australian rules football clubs established in 1898
Australian rules football clubs disestablished in 1941
Sport in Hobart
Tasmanian Football League clubs